The 1880 Yale Bulldogs football team represented Yale University in the 1880 college football season.

Schedule

Roster
 Rushers: Philo Carroll Fuller, Charles S. Beck, Louis K. Hull, John S. Harding, Benjamin B. Lamb, Charles Bigelow Storrs, Franklin M. Eaton
 Quarterback: Walter Irving Badger
 Halfbacks: Robert W. Watson, Walter Camp
 Back: Benjamin Wisner Bacon
 Others: John L. Adams, George H. Clark, John S. Durand, Howard H. Knapp, Chester W. Lyman, John F. Merrill, John Moorhead Jr., William Nixon, William A. Peters, Frederic Remington, Adrian S. Vandegraaf, Frederick R. Vernon
 Manager: William B. Hill

References

Yale
Yale Bulldogs football seasons
College football national champions
College football undefeated seasons
Yale Bulldogs football